MS Baltic Princess is a cruiseliner owned by the Estonia-based ferry operator Tallink and operated under their Silja Line brand. She was built by Aker Finnyards Helsinki New Shipyard in Helsinki, Finland in 2008. The ship began service on the cruise route between Helsinki, Finland to Tallinn, Estonia on 17 August 2008. From 1 February 2013 the ship began service on the Turku–Mariehamn–Stockholm route.

Concept and construction

The Baltic Princess was ordered as Tallink's fourth new cruiseliner in December 2005. The purpose of the vessel was at the time undisclosed, but after Tallink's purchase of Silja Line in 2006 it was revealed that the ship would replace  on the Tallinn–Helsinki cruise route. The ship was christened on March 6, 2008.

The forward sections of the ship was constructed at Aker Yards' Chantiers de l'Atlantique shipyard in France and was towed to Helsinki in April 2007. In September the section was towed into the drydock where the hull was completed. The ship was floated out of drydock in Helsinki on 9 March 2008 after being officially christened.

Service history
Baltic Princess was delivered to Tallink on 10 July 2008 and she entered the Tallinn–Helsinki route on 15 July 2008.

On 2 February 2013, MS Baltic Princess entered the Turku–Åland–Stockholm service and was re-flagged from Estonia to Finland. She was replaced on the Tallinn–Helsinki service by Silja Europa.

References

External links

 Tallink Silja official website
 Tallink Silja official website for Baltic Princess (in Finnish)
 Baltic Princess at marinetraffic.com

Ferries of Estonia
Ships built in Helsinki
Cruise ships
2008 ships
Ships built by Chantiers de l'Atlantique